The St. Peter's High School is an educational institution started by Mill Hill Missionaries from London in 1952 and belongs to Roman Catholic Diocese of Jammu-Srinagar.

History
Father John Boerkamp MHM and Lt. Col. Dean requested the then Hon’ble Chief Minister, Sheikh Abdullah, for a piece of land in order to build a Convent School in Jammu. He rented a house near Kashmiri Mohalla, Baba Jivan Shah and stayed there for 2 years. It was from the same house that St. Peters' High School, B.C Road originated in 1952. Initially, it was an Urdu Medium School and only those Catholic Students were admitted who were denied admission elsewhere in Jammu City. In 1954, Father Boerkamp bought a bungalow at B. C. Road Jammu and began an English Medium School there with the help of the Presentation Sisters.

Division 
In 1964, the Presentation Sisters shifted the school, now popularly known as Presentation Convent Senior Secondary School, to the new venue in Gandhi Nagar, where as B.C. Road School continued to function as St. Peters's.

Changes 
The School changed its medium of instruction from Urdu to English in 1984 and in 1987 it was recognized as a High School by the State Government.

See also 
 List of Christian Schools in India

References 

Catholic schools in India
Schools in Jammu (city)
Private schools in Jammu and Kashmir
Christian schools in Jammu and Kashmir
Educational institutions established in 1952
1952 establishments in India